Åke Andersson (2 September 1925 – 3 March 2005) was a Swedish long-distance runner who competed in the 1952 Summer Olympics.

References

1925 births
2005 deaths
Swedish male long-distance runners
Olympic athletes of Sweden
Athletes (track and field) at the 1952 Summer Olympics